Chang Yu-hern (born 25 January 1954) is Taiwanese educator. He served as Chairman of the Aviation Safety Council between 2010 and 2015.

Education
Chang obtained his bachelor's degree in mechanical engineering from National Cheng Kung University and master's degree in traffic and transportation from National Chiao Tung University. He continued his doctoral degree in civil engineering at the University of Pennsylvania in the United States.

Aviation Safety Council Chairmanship

Aviation Safety Council Chairmanship appointment
Upon his appointment as Chairman of the Aviation Safety Council (ASC), Chang said that he had set a goal of zero aviation accidents. Having served as the Director-General of Civil Aeronautics Administration, he would continue to promote and elevate flight safety with his administrative experience and professional knowledge of flight safety management. His top priority would be to reorganized the ASC and make it an official, independent government organization in coordination with the Executive Yuan. His second priority would be to conduct investigations of aviation accidents that do not involve major affairs, airplane crashes and passenger mortality within one year and figure out the real cause.

References

1954 births
Living people
Political office-holders in the Republic of China on Taiwan